Arthur's Meadow is a nature reserve managed by the Wildlife Trust for Bedfordshire, Cambridgeshire and Northamptonshire. It has been designated a Site of Special Scientific Interest.

References 

Sites of Special Scientific Interest in Cambridgeshire
Nature reserves in Cambridgeshire
Wildlife Trust for Bedfordshire, Cambridgeshire and Northamptonshire reserves
Meadows in Cambridgeshire